Pointe Michel is a small town on the southwest coast of Dominica. It is located to the south of the capital, Roseau, and is known for being the birthplace of Dominica's first (and to date only) female Prime Minister, Dame Eugenia Charles.

The actress Alphonsia Emmanuel was born here in 1956.

Sources
 Crask, Paul, 2007: Dominica, p. 103. Chalfont St Peter: Bradt Travel Guides 

Populated places in Dominica
Saint Luke Parish, Dominica